Anders Sølvsten Holvad (born 24 June 1990) is a Danish professional footballer who plays for FC Fredericia as a forward.

Career

Early career
A prospect from the Randers FC academy, Holvad appeared for reserve team Randers Freja in the third-tier 2nd Division before moving back to his childhood club, Vivild IF competing in the fifth-tier Jutland Series in March 2010. After the club suffered relegation to the seventh-tier Series 1, he had a successful trial with Viborg FF, but only played there for six months, making one appearance in the second-tier 1st Division. He then played for Kjellerup IF before moving to Brabrand IF in January 2014.

Hobro
On 3 February 2016, Holvad signed a six-month contract with Hobro competing in the Danish Superliga. The move came to fruition after a strong first half to the season for Brabrand, where he was top goalscorer for the team in the third-tier 2nd Division. He signed a one-year contract extension with the club in July 2016, a full-time professional deal for the first time in his career, after Hobro had suffered relegation to the second-tier 1st Division. Holvad started the 2016–17 season in strong fashion, resulting in six goals in 11 appearances. He was, however, benched towards to end of the season despite being the team's top goalscorer. He finished the season with 30 league appearances in which he scored nine goals, as Hobro reached promotion to the Superliga. In total, he made 42 appearances for Hobro with 10 goals to his name.

Fredericia
On 13 June 2017, Holvad signed a two-year contract with 1st Division club FC Fredericia as a free agent. He immediately established himself as a starter and key player for the club, playing mostly as a winger, after the club had initially brought him in as a forward.

On 23 November 2018, Holvad signed a five-year contract extension, keeping him in Fredericia until 2023.

KÍ Klaksvík
On 10 June 2022 Faroese club KÍ Klaksvík confirmed that Holvad had joined the club on a deal until the end of 2023.

He made his European debut on 6 July 2022, coming on as a late substitute for Claes Kronberg in a 3–0 loss in the UEFA Champions League qualifiers to Bodø/Glimt.

Return to Fredericia
On 28 January 2023, Holvad returned to Denmark, signing a deal until June 2024 with his former club, FC Fredericia.

Honours

Hobro
1st Division: 2016–17

References

External links
 
 

1990 births
Living people
Danish men's footballers
Danish expatriate footballers
People from Norddjurs Municipality
Sportspeople from the Central Denmark Region
Viborg FF players
Kjellerup IF players
Hobro IK players
Danish 1st Division players
Danish 2nd Division players
Danish Superliga players
Association football forwards
FC Fredericia players
Randers FC players
Brabrand IF players
KÍ Klaksvík players
Expatriate footballers in the Faroe Islands